Starshine 3 (also called SO-43 and OSCAR 43) is one of five satellites in the Starshine project (Student Tracked Atmospheric Research Satellite for Heuristic International Equipment).

Starshine 3's main task was to study the density of the Earth's upper atmosphere. In addition, 31 laser reflectors and a radio beacon in the amateur radio frequency range (145.825 MHz) were attached. The transmitter was powered by solar cells and batteries. Starshine 3 had neither drive nor position control.

Mission
The satellite, together with the PICOSat, PCSat and SAPPHIRE satellites, was launched on September 30, 2001 with an Athena I rocket from Kodiak Launch Complex, Alaska, USA.

Because of the mirrors, the satellite was visible to the naked eye from Earth at night. Students measured the difference in the daily shortening orbital period and derived the density of the atmosphere. They also measured fluctuations in the intensity of UV radiation from the sun, which they associated with different densities in the atmosphere.

Starshine 3 burned up on January 21, 2003 after 7,434 orbits in the earth's atmosphere about two years earlier than originally expected.

See also

 OSCAR
 STARSHINE (satellite)

External links
 . NASA

References

Amateur radio satellites
Spacecraft launched in 2001